Sayuri is a common feminine Japanese given name.

Possible writings
Sayuri can be written using different kanji characters and can mean:
小百合, "small, lily"
早百合, "early, lily"
佐由里, "assistant, reason, home town"
小百里, "small, hundred, home town"

The name can also be written in hiragana さゆり or katakana サユリ.

Notable people with the name
 , Japanese singer
 , Japanese television personality in South Korea
 , Japanese voice actress
 , Japanese shogi player
 , Japanese enka singer
 , Japanese singer
 , Japanese actress, singer and lyricist
 , Japanese actress and singer
 , Japanese actress
 , Japanese voice actress
 , Japanese singer
 , Japanese speed skater
 , Japanese rhythmic gymnast
 , Japanese singer
 , Japanese shogi player
 , Japanese hairdresser, businesswoman and photographer
 , Japanese women's footballer
 , Japanese voice actress
 , Japanese voice actress
 , Japanese actress

Fictional characters
 Sayuri Kinniku (キン肉 小百合), from the manga and anime series Kinnikuman
 Sayuri Kurata (倉田 佐祐理), from the visual novel and media franchise Kanon  
Sayuri Nitta (born Chiyo Sakamoto), from the 1997 novel and 2005 film Memoirs of a Geisha
Sayuri Sawatari (沢渡 さゆり), from the 2004 film The Place Promised in Our Early Days
Sayuri Suizenji (水前寺 小百合), from the mecha anime series Machine Robo Rescue
Sayuri, from the video game Gemini Rue
Sayuri Kakinuma (柿沼 小百合), supporting character in the novel Another
Sayuri Hanayori (花依 小百合), supporting character in the manga and anime series Seraph of the End

References

Japanese feminine given names